Mughlai cuisine consists of dishes developed in the medieval Indo-Persian cultural centres of the Mughal Empire. It represents a combination of cuisine of the Indian subcontinent with the cooking styles and recipes of Central Asian and Islamic cuisine. Mughlai cuisine is strongly influenced by the Turkic cuisine of Central Asia, the region where the early Mughal emperors originally hailed from, and it has in turn strongly influenced the regional cuisines of Northern India, Pakistan and Bangladesh.

The tastes of Mughlai cuisine vary from extremely mild to spicy, and are often associated with a distinctive aroma and the taste of ground and whole spices. A Mughlai course is an elaborate buffet of main course dishes with a variety of accompaniments.

History 
Although the ruling class and administrative elite of the Mughal Empire could variously identify themselves as Turani (Turkic), Irani (Persian), Shaikhzada (Indian Muslim) and Hindu Rajput, the empire itself was Indo-Persian, having a hybridized, pluralistic Persianate culture. Decorated Indo-Persian cookbooks and culinary manuscripts adorned the personal libraries of the Mughal elite, serving as both culinary guides and for aesthetic value.

One example was the Ni'matnama, a 15th-century work illustrated with Persian miniatures. This was commissioned by Sultan Ghiyas Shah, a sultan of Malwa in modern-day Madhya Pradesh, and features Central Asian dishes such as samosas (fried meat-filled pastry), khichri (rice and lentils), pilaf (rice dish), seekh (skewered meat and fish), kabab (skewered, roasted meat) and yakhni (meat broth), as well as western and southern Indian dishes, such as karhi (yogurt broth mixed with chickpea flour), piccha and khandvi.

From the Mughal period itself, one popular culinary work was the Nuskha-i-Shahjahani, a record of the dishes believed to be prepared for the court of Emperor Shahjahan (r.1627-1658). This Persian manuscript features ten chapters, on nānhā (breads), āsh-hā (pottages), qalīyas and dopiyāzas (dressed meat dishes), bhartas, zerbiryāns (a kind of layered rice-based dish), pulāʾo, kabābs, harīsas (savoury porridge), shishrangas and ḵẖāgīnas (omelette), and khichṛī; the final chapter involves murabbā (jams), achār (pickles), pūrī (fried bread), fhīrīnī (sweets), ḥalwā (warm pudding), and basic recipes for the preparation of yoghurt, panīr (Indian curd cheese) and the coloring of butter and dough.

Another famous textbook was Ḵẖulāṣat-i Mākūlāt u Mashrūbāt, perhaps dating to the era of the emperor Aurangzeb (r. 1656–1707), while another was Alwān-i Niʿmat, a work dedicated solely to sweetmeats. Divya Narayanan writes:These include varieties of sweet breads such as nān ḵẖatā̤ʾī (crisp bread, like a biscuit), sweet pūrīs, sweet samosas (or saṃbosas), laḍḍū and ḥalwā. The cookbook introduces each recipe with a line of praise: for instance saṃbosa-i yak tuhī dam dāda (samosa with a pocket cooked on dam) is declared as being ‘among the famous and well-known sweets; pūrī dam dāda bādāmī (almond pūrīs cooked on dam) is said to be ‘among the delicious and excellent sweetmeats, and nān ḵẖatā̤ʾī bādāmī (almond nān ḵẖatā̤ʾī) is noted for being ‘among the rare and delicious recipes.There are even many commonalities between Indo-Persian cookbooks used at the Mughal court and contemporary culinary works from Safavid Iran, such as the Kārnāma dar bāb-i T̤abāḵẖī wa ṣanʿat-i ān (Manual on Dishes and their Preparation) of Ḥājī Muḥammad ʿAlī Bāwarchī Bag̱ẖdādī.

Mughlai cuisine is renowned for the richness and aromaticity of the meals due to extensive use of spices like saffron, cardamom, black pepper, dry fruits and nuts, as well as rich cream, milk and butter in preparation of curry bases. This has influenced the development of North Indian cuisine.

List of Mughlai dishes
 Biryani 
 Mutton/chicken chap
 Mutton/chicken pasinda
 Haleem
 Khichda
 Korma
 Nihari
 South Asian pilaf (first introduced by the Delhi Sultanate)
 Bakarkhani
 Baklava
 Aloo gosht (lamb/mutton and potato curry)
 Qeema matar (ground-lamb and pea curry)
 South Asian kofta
 Shahi paneer
 Shorba
 South Asian kebab (first introduced during Delhi Sultanate):
 Galawati kebab (soft, tender patty-like kebab first prepared by Haji Murad Ali of Lucknow)
 Bihari kebab (meat-chunks roasted in open flame)
 Kakori kebab (first prepared in Uttar Pradesh, India)
 Chapli kebab (first prepared by Pashtuns in the northwest frontier of India)
 Kalmi kebab
 Seekh kebab
 Shami kebab (first prepared by Syrian cooks in the Mughal era, "Shami" denoting their Syrian origin)
 Shikampur kebab (native to Hyderabad, India)
 Murgir kebab
 Tunde ke kabab
 Mughlai paratha
 Murgh musallam
 Pasanda
 Shawarma
 Chicken tikka
 Rezala (introduced to Bengal by the Mughlai sovereigns of Awadh and Mysore)
 Paneer tikka

Desserts
 Phirni
 Gulab jamun 
 Jalebi
 Falooda
 South Asian halwa
 South Asian seviyan (prepared with milk, clarified butter, vermicelli, rose-water and almonds)
 Sharbat
 Kulfi
 Barfi (derived from the Persian word for 'snow/ice')
 Firni
 Kesari firni (rice-based sweet dish streaked with saffron)
 Bedami firni (rice-based sweet dish with almonds)
 Shahi tukra (rich bread pudding with dry fruits and flavored with cardamom)
 Sheer khurma
 Several varieties of indigenous mangoes were cherished and cultivated by the Mughal court.

See also 
 Cuisine of Karachi

References

Further reading 
 Mughlai Cook Book, Diamond Pocket Books,  
 Nita Mehta's Vegetarian Mughlai Khaana By Nita Mehta, Published 1999 
 Mughlai By Amrita Patel Published 2004, Sterling Publishers, 160 pages

External links 
 Mughlai Recipes
  Mughal Emperors' Food

 
Mughal culture 
Indian cuisine
Uzbekistani cuisine
Indian cuisine by culture
Islamic cuisine 
North Indian cuisine
Uttar Pradeshi cuisine
Awadhi cuisine
Pakistani cuisine
Punjabi cuisine
Sindhi cuisine
Bangladeshi cuisine